is a town located in Kitamatsuura District, Nagasaki Prefecture, Japan. As of March 31, 2017, the town has an estimated population of 13,825 and a density of 430 persons per km². The total area is 32.30 km².

References

External links

 Saza official website 

Towns in Nagasaki Prefecture